1929 Academy Awards may refer to:

 1st Academy Awards, the Academy Awards ceremony that took place May 16, 1929, honoring films released in 1927 and 1928
 2nd Academy Awards, the Academy Awards ceremony that took place April 3, 1930, honoring films released between August 1, 1928, and July 31, 1929
 3rd Academy Awards, the Academy Awards ceremony that took place November 5, 1930, honoring films released between August 1, 1929, and July 31, 1930